Punkva is a  long river in South Moravia, Czech Republic. It is a Subterranean river in the Moravian Karst and a left tributary of the Svitava. It is the longest underground river in the Czech Republic.

The river forms underground as a confluence of two other underground streams. Sloupský potok is the large of the two and enters the underground within the Sloup-Šošuv cave system near Sloup. Its own source is the Luha, which is therefore Punkva's ultimate source. The other source is Bílá Voda, which sinks near Nová Rasovna cave by Holštejn.

The river flows into the Macocha Gorge and forms a small lake at the bottom. The water reenters the underground thereafter and forms the Punkva Caves, which are a tourist attraction attached to Macocha. Tourists are taken by boat through a part of the system.

After leaving the caves Punkva flows through a valley and several fish ponds. Multiple small local streams are its right tributaries. It enters the Svitava on the southern side of Blansko and its flow joins the Danube watershed.

External Links 
Turistika.cz: Punkva

Rivers of the South Moravian Region
Blansko District